Assiniboia is a provincial electoral division in the Canadian province of Manitoba. It was first created for the 1879 provincial election, was eliminated in 1888, and was re-established in 1903. It is located in the westernmost tip of the City of Winnipeg.

Assiniboia is bordered on the east by St. James and Lakeside, to the south by Kirkfield Park, to the north by Lakeside, and to the west by Morris.

The riding's population in 1996 was 20,441. In 1999, the average family income was $53,881, and the unemployment rate was 6.50%. Retail trade accounts for 15% of the riding's industry.

Until 1920, Assiniboia was a marginal riding between the Manitoba Liberal Party and Conservative Party. Between 1920 and 1949, it was a hotly contested riding between the Conservatives and candidates of the Independent Labour Party and Manitoba Co-operative Commonwealth Federation (CCF).

The riding was dominated by the Liberals from 1949 until 1977, and then by the Progressive Conservatives from 1977 to 1999.  The New Democratic Party of Manitoba's (NDP) victory in 1999 was completely unexpected, and occurred by a margin of only three votes.

List of provincial representatives

Electoral results

1879 general election

1883 general election

1886 general election

1888 by-election

1903 general election

1907 general election

1910 general election

1914 general election

1915 general election

1920 general election

1922 general election

1927 general election

1932 general election

1936 general election

1941 general election

1945 general election

1949 general election

1953 general election

1958 general election

1959 general election

1962 general election

1966 general election

1969 general election

1973 general election

1977 general election

1981 general election

1986 general election

1988 general election

1990 general election

1995 general election

1999 general election

2003 general election

2007 general election

2011 general election

2016 general election

2019 general election

Previous Boundaries

References

Manitoba provincial electoral districts
Politics of Winnipeg